Pere Tresfort was a minor Catalan Occitan poet of the early fifteenth century. Three of his poems are preserved in the Cançoner Vega-Aguiló and from their rubrics it can be ascertained that Pere was a notary.

His song "Ab fletxes d'aur untatz d'erb'amorosa" consists in one decasyllabic stanza and a tornada. This theme was revisited at greater length by Ausiàs March towards the end of the century. The dansa "Jovencelhs qui no à.ymia" is written in praise of love. Pere's third song is "Gran carrech han huy tuyt l'om de paratge".

Sources
Riquer, Martín de (1964). Història de la Literatura Catalana, vol. 1. Barcelona: Edicions Ariel.
Incipitario di Pere Tresfort at the Repertorio informatizzato dell'antica letteratura catalana (RIALC)

Poets from Catalonia
Occitan-language Catalan writers
Year of death unknown
Year of birth unknown
Spanish male poets